Kelvin Mack Edwards (born July 19, 1964) is a former American football wide receiver in the National Football League (NFL) for the New Orleans Saints and Dallas Cowboys. He also was a member of the Dallas Texans of the Arena Football League. He played college football at Liberty University.

Early years
Edwards attended Russell High School, where he played as a wide receiver. He accepted a football scholarship from Liberty University, where he was a part of a passing offense that included wide receiver Fred Banks.

As a senior, he led the team and set the school career records in receptions, receiving yards, touchdown receptions, scoring, kickoff returns and punt returns. The team's final two games of the season were canceled after the flooding of James River, that caused $2 million in damage to the athletic facility and destroyed all football equipment.

He caught a pass in 32 consecutive games and 39 of his 41 contests. He finished as the school's record holder in career receiving yards (2,546) and career receiving touchdowns (24). He was selected to play in the 1985 Blue–Gray Football Classic.

Edwards also practiced track and set the school record in the 300 and 400 metres.

In 2009, he was inducted into the Liberty Athletics Hall of Fame.

In 2019, Liberty Flames retired Edwards' jersey #83.

Edwards became Liberty's second-highest NFL draft pick when he was selected in the fourth round of the 1986 draft by the New Orleans Saints. His three-year professional football career was spotlighted when he was a starting wide receiver for the Dallas Cowboys.

Professional career

New Orleans Saints
Edwards was selected by the New Orleans Saints in the fourth round (88th overall) of the 1986 NFL Draft. As a rookie, he caught 9 of his 10 receptions in the final six games. He totaled 10 receptions for 132 yards and one carry for 6 yards. He was waived on September 7, 1987.

Dallas Cowboys
After the players went on a strike on the third week of the 1987 season, those games were canceled (reducing the 16 game season to 15) and the NFL decided that the games would be played with replacement players. In September, he was signed to be a part of the Dallas Cowboys replacement team, that was given the mock name "Rhinestone Cowboys" by the media.

Although he was a backup wide receiver behind Sebron Spivey in the first game against the New York Jets, he earned the starting position after making 2 receptions for 68 yards and 2 touchdowns. He was named NFC Offensive Player of the Week after making 6 receptions for 100 yards and scoring on a 62-yard reverse run against the Philadelphia Eagles on October 11, which was the longest rush by a wide receiver in franchise history. The next game against the Washington Redskins, he had 6 receptions for 104 yards and a 38-yard touchdown. He ended up being one of the Cowboys best players during the replacement games, posting 14 receptions for 272 yards and 3 touchdown receptions, including a 62-yard touchdown run on a reverse. He was kept for the rest of the season, starting 7 additional games, while finishing with a total of 34 receptions for 521 yards and 3 touchdowns.

In 1988, he suffered a knee injury that required arthroscopic knee surgery in June. In the fourth quarter of the season opener against the Pittsburgh Steelers, he re-injured the knee when he was leading the team with 5 receptions for 93 yards. Although he played in 7 more games (including one start), he was never at full speed and did not catch another pass. He was placed on the injured reserve list on November 29.

In 1989, he was limited with a right knee injury and underwent arthroscopic knee surgery in June. He was released before the start of the season.

San Francisco 49ers
In 1991, he signed as a free agent with the San Francisco 49ers. He was released on May 14.

Hamilton Tiger-Cats (CFL)
On July 22, 1991, he was signed by the Hamilton Tiger-Cats of the Canadian Football League to their practice roster. He was released on August 26.

Dallas Texans (AFL)
On June 16, 1993, he was signed by the Dallas Texans of the Arena Football League. He played in one game making 5 receptions for 30 yards and one tackle.

Personal life
Edwards currently owns a car dealership.

References

1964 births
Living people
Players of American football from Birmingham, Alabama
Players of American football from Georgia (U.S. state)
American football wide receivers
Liberty Flames football players
New Orleans Saints players
Dallas Cowboys players
Dallas Texans (Arena) players
National Football League replacement players